Modugla Venugopala Reddy  is an Indian politician, belonging to YSR Congress Party.  He was with TDP till February 2019, and in 2014 he contested to Andhra Pradesh Legislative Assembly and won against Former Minister Kanna Lakshminarayana from Guntur West  Assembly Constituency.In the 2009 election he was elected to the 15th Lok Sabha from the Narasaraopet constituency in Andhra Pradesh.

Modugula Venugopala Reddy was born to Shri Modugula Papi Reddy & Smt. Modugula Adilakshmi and is married to Smt. Madhavi Krishna.

General Elections 2009

Assembly elections 2014

References

External links
 Official biographical sketch in Parliament of India website

India MPs 2009–2014
Living people
Lok Sabha members from Andhra Pradesh
YSR Congress Party politicians
Telugu Desam Party politicians
People from Guntur district
Telugu politicians
1966 births